The 2015 Piala Presiden is the 31st season of the Piala Presiden since its establishment in 1986. The league is currently the youth level (U21) football league in Malaysia. Perak U21 are the defending champions.

Rule changes
The Piala Presiden is the amateur football competition in Malaysia for under-21 players. Since its inception in 1985, the Piala Presiden has been the major tournament for under-21 and under-23 players. In 2009, the format of the competition was changed with only under-20 players eligible to be fielded for the tournament. In 2015 the format of the competition reverted to the original format with under-21 players and three over age players eligible to play.

Teams
The following teams will be participate in the 2015 Piala Presiden. In order by the number given by FAM:-

  Perlis FA
  Kuala Lumpur FA
  Penang FA
  Malacca United S.A.
  Pahang FA
  Kedah FA
  PKNS F.C.
  PDRM FA
  ATM FA
  Felda United F.C.
  T-Team F.C.
  Johor Darul Ta'zim F.C.
  NS Matrix F.C.
  Selangor FA
  Sime Darby F.C.
  Terengganu FA
  Sarawak FA
  Kelantan FA
  Perak FA
  Sabah FA

Team summaries

Personnel and kits
Note: Flags indicate national team as has been defined under FIFA eligibility rules. Players and Managers may hold more than one non-FIFA nationality.

League table

Group A

Group B

Fixtures and results
Fixtures and results of the Piala Presiden 2015 season.

Source: FAM

Group A

Week 1

Week 2

Week 3

Week 4

Week 5

Week 6

Week 7

Group B

Week 1

Week 2

Week 3

Week 4

Week 5

Week 6

Week 7

Knock-out stage 
In the knockout phase, teams played against each other over two legs on a home-and-away basis, except for the one-match final.

Quarter-finals
The first legs were played on 25 July 2015, and the second legs were played on 1 and 2 August 2015.

First leg

Second leg

Semi-finals

First leg

Second leg

Final

Champions

Season statistics

Scoring

Top scorers

See also

 2015 Malaysia Super League
 2015 Malaysia Premier League
 2015 Malaysia FAM League
 2015 Malaysia FA Cup
 2015 Piala Belia

References

External links
 Football Association of Malaysia
 SPMB 

2015 in Malaysian football
Piala Presiden (Malaysia)